Salomè (also known as Salomi) is a 1972 Italian drama film directed and produced by Carmelo Bene. It stars Bene, Lydia Mancinelli, Alfiero Vincenti and Donyale Luna in the lead roles. A psychedelic re-telling of the biblical story, Salome is the daughter of King Herod's second wife. The King is infatuated with her, and after she fails to seduce the prophet John the Baptist, she dances for the King in order to ask for his execution. The story is told with fast cuts, repetitive dialogue and extreme satire. Australian-born composer Ashley Irwin composed the film's music.

Cast
 Carmelo Bene
 Lydia Mancinelli
 Alfiero Vincenti
 Donyale Luna
 Veruschka von Lehndorff
 Piero Vida
 Franco Leo
 Juan Fernández

References

External links
 

1970s Italian-language films
1972 films
1972 drama films
Italian drama films
Cultural depictions of Salome
1970s Italian films